The H. Lee White Marine Museum is located in Oswego, New York. It was founded in 1982 by Rosemary Sinnett Nesbitt (1924–2009), a local professor and the City of Oswego Historian. Nesbitt retired from directorship of the museum in 2008 after completing 25 years of service.

It is the current home of the tugboat Nash, a National Historic Landmark, one of the few remaining US Army vessels from the Normandy Landings.

Located at the museum is the Derrick Boat No. 8, added to the National Register of Historic Places in 2015.

See also
  List of maritime museums in the United States
  List of museum ships

References

External links
 Official site

Maritime museums in New York (state)
Museums in Oswego County, New York
Oswego, New York